Punch is a 2014–2015 South Korean television series starring Kim Rae-won, Kim Ah-joong, Cho Jae-hyun, Seo Ji-hye, and On Joo-wan. It aired on SBS from 15 December 2014 to 17 February 2015 on Mondays and Tuesdays at 21:55 for 19 episodes.

Plot
Punch is a record of the last six months of Park Jung-hwan's life. He is the chief of the anti-corruption investigation team for the Supreme Prosecutors' Office. To get to his position, Jung-hwan has made compromises to achieve what he thought of as the greater good, though it meant losing some of his soul in the process. But when he gets diagnosed with a malignant brain tumor and told that he only has six months left to live, it makes Jung-hwan reexamine his life choices. He decides to pursue justice whatever the cost, even if it means sacrificing his life. This is his last attempt to make things right, one final "punch" against the crooked world. And his main goal is bringing down his boss Prosecutor General Lee Tae-joon, whose friendly public face masks his unscrupulous morals and rampant corruption.

Helping Jung-hwan in his quest is his ex-wife, Shin Ha-kyung. Ha-kyung is an idealistic prosecutor for the Seoul District, and chose her profession over having a lucrative law career. She divorced Jung-hwan because he was obsessed with ambition and never had time for her and their young daughter, Ye-rin. But that doesn't mean she doesn't still care for him, though her concern is mixed with resentment.

Cast

Main Cast
Kim Rae-won as Park Jung-hwan
Kim Ah-joong as Shin Ha-kyung
Cho Jae-hyun as Lee Tae-joon, Prosecutor General
Seo Ji-hye as Choi Yeon-jin
Choi Myung-gil as Yoon Ji-sook, Minister of Justice

Supporting Cast
On Joo-wan as Lee Ho-sung
Kim Eung-soo as Jung Gook-hyun
Lee Han-wi as Oh Dong-choon, detective
Park Hyuk-kwon as Cho Kang-jae, prosecutor
Song Ok-sook as Jung-hwan's mother
Kim Ji-young as Park Ye-rin
Lee Young-eun as Park Hyun-sun
Lee Ki-young as Lee Tae-sub
Jang Hyun-sung as Jang Min-seok
Kim Hye-yoon as Cho Kang-jae's daughter
Ryu Seung-soo (cameo)
Kang Ha-neul (cameo)

Ratings 
In the tables below, the blue numbers represent the lowest ratings and the red numbers represent the highest ratings.

Awards and nominations

International broadcast
It aired on ONE TV ASIA in Malaysia, Singapore and Indonesia premiering on 12 January 2015.

References

External links
Punch official SBS website 

2014 South Korean television series debuts
2015 South Korean television series endings
Seoul Broadcasting System television dramas
Television series about prosecutors
South Korean political television series
South Korean thriller television series
Television series by HB Entertainment